Gerrit Pieter Bicker (1554–1604) was a Dutch merchant, patrician, and one of the founders of the Compagnie van Verre and its successor the Dutch East India Company.

Family

Born in Amsterdam, he was the son of the brewer Pieter Bicker and his wife Lijsbeth Banninck and belonged to the powerful Bicker family of regenten. In 1580 Gerrit married Aleyd Andriesdr Boelens (descended from the knight Andries Boelens), making him brother in law to Claes Boelens, mayor of Amsterdam—they had five children: Jan, Andries, Cornelis and  Jacob Bicker.

Life
In 1585 Bicker was one of the richest merchants in Amsterdam, initially living on the Oudezijds Achterburgwal and later on the Niezel. In 1590 he was elected to the town council and six years later he not only became one of the founding directors of the Compagnie van Verre but also invested in Uilenburg, whilst also involved in the sale of plots of land. In 1597 he and his brother Laurens established the Compagnie van Guinee to trade with Guinea and on the Río de la Plata in South America. In 1601 Gerard le Roy and Laurens Bicker led the twelfth Dutch expedition to the east Indies, paid for by the Vereenigde Zeeuwse Compagnie (United Zeeland Company), a 'voorcompagnie'.

In 1590 Bicker was appointed Schepen and advisor of Amsterdam. In he sold his father's brewery. In 1602 he became one of the first financial backers of the Dutch East India Company, contributing 21,000 gulden. He was also one of the first Dutch traders to trade with the White Sea. In 1603 he became mayor of Amsterdam. His son laid the foundation stone of the Zuiderkerk.

In 1604 Gerrit was 'ambachtsheer' of Amstelveen, Nieuwer-Amstel.

Sources
  Zandvliet, Kees, De 250 rijksten van de Gouden Eeuw. Kapitaal, macht, familie en levensstijl (2006 Amsterdam; Nieuw Amsterdam Uitgevers), 73

References

External links 
 

Mayors of Amsterdam
1554 births
1604 deaths
16th-century Dutch people
17th-century Dutch people
Gerrit
Businesspeople from Amsterdam